Peleh or Pelleh or Poleh or Palleh or Pelah may refer to:
 Poleh, Hormozgan
 Pelah Kabud, Ilam Province
 Pelah, Kudristan
 Peleh-ye Baba Hoseyn, Lorestan Province
 Peleh-ye Kolkol, Ilam Province
 Pelleh Hava, Lorestan Province